Min Andistekese (Greek: Μην Αντιστέκεσαι; English: Don't Resist) is the second studio album by Greek pop musician Sakis Rouvas, released in September 1992 in Greece and Cyprus by PolyGram Records Greece. Like his self-titled debut album, this album was also entirely produced by composer Nikos Terzis, furthering the already rewarding collaboration.

Track listing
"Na Ziseis Moro Mou" (Live My Baby) [Happy Birthday Baby] 
"Gyrna" (Come Back)
"Dose Mou Mia Nyhta" (Give Me One Night)
"Ola Ine Mia Fygi" (Everything Is An Escape)
"Min Andistekese" (Don't Resist)
"Gia Fantasou" (Come On, Imagine)
"Me Kommeni Tin Anasa" (Breathless)
"Pseftika" (Fake)
"Mia Parousia" (A Presence)
"To Proto Mou Lathos" (My First Mistake)
"Ela Sopa" (Come, Be Silent)
"Ego S'agapo" (I Love You)

Note: The tracks "Yia Fantasou" and "Ego S'agapo" were previously released on his debut album Sakis Rouvas.

Singles
"Gyrna"
The first single from the album was "Gyrna".
"Min Andistekese"
The second single from the album was the title track. The music video for "Min Andistekese" was directed by Etien Theotokis and was the only music video released from the album. It features Rouvas leaning against a motorcycle and dancing in order to capture the attention of a woman and also shows him tending bar and playing billiards.
"Gia Fantasou"
The third single from the album was "Gia Fantasou" which was also included on Rouvas' debut album.
"Me Kommeni Tin Anasa"
The fourth single from the album was "Me Kommeni Tin Anasa". The title of Rouvas' first greatest hits album in 1999 originated from this song.
"Na Ziseis Moro Mou"
"Na Ziseis Moro Mou" was the fifth and final single from the album. It contains voice-overs from Batman.

References

External links
 Sakis Rouvas' official site

1992 albums
Albums produced by Nikos Terzis
Greek-language albums
Sakis Rouvas albums
Universal Music Greece albums